Mycosphaerella pomi is a fungus in the Mycosphaerellaceae family.

It was first described by Giovanni Passerini in 1878 as Sphaerella pomi, and transferred to the genus, Mycosphaerella, in 1897 by Gustav Lindau. The species epithet, pomi, is the genitive of Latin, pomum ("apple") and refers to the fact that this is a fungus found on apples.

See also
 List of Mycosphaerella species

References

Fungal plant pathogens and diseases
pomi
Fungi described in 1897